Fabrizio Melara (born 6 May 1986) is an Italian professional footballer who plays as a midfielder for ASD Santa Marinella 1947.

References

External links
 

1986 births
Living people
Footballers from Rome
Association football midfielders
Italian footballers
Serie B players
Serie C players
Serie D players
U.S. Salernitana 1919 players
A.S. Sambenedettese players
Aurora Pro Patria 1919 players
A.C. Carpi players
U.S. Lecce players
Benevento Calcio players
S.S. Juve Stabia players